Honayn's Shoe  is a 2009 film.

Synopsis 
Honayn’s Shoe is an animated tale about a lost nomad’s search in the desert, with his camel, for his lost shoe.

Awards 
 African Movie Academy Awards 2010

External links 

2009 films
Egyptian animated films
Egyptian short films